An estimate is an approximation based on incomplete information.

Estimate may also refer to:
 Estimates, annual preliminary budget forecasts in the Westminster system of government
 Sales quote, estimate of cost provided to a potential buyer
 Appraisal (disambiguation), estimate of price provided to a potential seller
 Upper and lower bounds in mathematics 
 Estimate (horse), a racehorse foaled in 2009
 Estimate (card game), also called Oh Hell, Oh Pshaw or Nomination Whist
 Estimate of the Situation (Project Sign), a 1948 claimed U.S. government report on UFOs